Maria Virginia Errázuriz Guilisasti, also known as Virginia Errázuriz, (born 1941 in Santiago, Chile) is a Chilean painter, professor, printmaker and draftsperson.

Biography 
Errázuriz studied at University of Chile (1961–1965) and University of York (1979). By 1964 Errázuriz began to get involved in art. She discovered new materials. By the end of the 1960s she began to work professionally and to have exhibitions. Her exhibitions were organized by her husband Francisco Brugnoli (born 1935). He took her experimental works to the Museo de Arte Latinoamericano. In the late 1960s Errázuriz began to educate students at universities across Santiago. Her art was exhibited in Chile and across the world, including Barcelona, Buenos Aires and Venezuela. In 1979 she finished her studies at the University of York in Toronto, Canada. Her work is described as an economy of means, meaning she selects materials to emphasize the objects frailty. Through her work, we can see clearly an antiestablishment side that responds to the social and political issues endured by her country of Chile, during the years of 1970-1980. Her unique approach to art looked to make the viewer perplexed, as her work demonstrated puzzling objects and installations.

Exhibitions

Solo exhibitions 
 1975 Exhibition of Paintings, Chilean-French Institute, Santiago, Chile
 1983 Instituto Chileno – Francés, Valparaíso, Chile
 1984 Landscape installation, South Gallery, Santiago, Chile
 1985 Plot – Destrama, Bucci Gallery, Santiago, Chile
 1997 Intervention of the building located in Huérfanos 1721 Santiago, Chile

Collectives 
 1962 Hall of Students of the University of Chile, Santiago. She also participated in 1963, 1964 and 1965
 1962 Plastic Arts Fair, Santiago. He participated until 1968.
 1963 Official Show, Museum of Contemporary Art, University of Chile, Santiago, Chile
 1964 CRAV and CAP Hall, Museum of Contemporary Art, University of Chile, Santiago, Chile
 1964 Exhibition of the Student Workshop of José Balmes, Santiago, Chile
 1966 Young Chilean Painting, Central Art Gallery, Santiago, Chile
 1966 Goethe Institute, Santiago, Chile
 1967 Carmen Waugh Gallery, Santiago, Chile
 1968 20 Chilean Painters, El Patio Gallery, Santiago, Chile
 1969 The Drawing in Fine Arts, Museum of Contemporary Art, University of Chile, Santiago, Chile
 1969 America did not invoke your name in vain, Museum of Contemporary Art, University of Chile, Santiago, Chile
 1970 Del Triunfo, Museum of Contemporary Art, University of Chile, Santiago, Chile.
 1971 Exhibition I Anniversary of the Popular Government, Museum of Contemporary Art, University of Chile, Santiago, Chile
 1972 Exhibition II Anniversary of the Popular Government, Museum of Contemporary Art, University of Chile, Santiago, Chile
 1972 Exhibition of Teachers of the Department of Plastic Arts, School of Fine Arts, University of Chile, Santiago, Chile
 1973 National Museum of Fine Arts, Santiago, Chile
 1975 Chilean-French Institute, Santiago, Chile
 1976 Lithographs, Bellavista Gallery 61, Santiago, Chile
 1978 First National Graphic Exhibition Pontificia Universidad Católica de Chile, National Museum of Fine Arts, Santiago, Chile.
 1978 First National Graphic Exhibition Pontificia Universidad Católica de Chile, National Museum of Fine Arts, Santiago, Chile
 1978 Recreating Goya, Instituto Chileno-Francés, Santiago, Chile
 1979 Biennal of Printmaking, Wellington, New Zealand
 1979 Triennial of Latin American Engraving, Buenos Aires, Argentina
 1980 House of Culture Pablo Neruda, Corbeil, France
 1980 Center for Fine Arts, Maracaibo, Venezuela.
 1980 Second National Graphic Exhibition Pontificia Universidad Católica de Chile. National Museum of Fine Arts, Santiago, Chile
 1981 The Israeli Poetry through the Chilean Plastic Expression, National Museum of Fine Arts, Santiago, Chile
 1981 Picasso Workshop, Barcelona, Spain
 1983 Fifty Years of Plastic in Chile from Matta to the present, Cultural Institute of Las Condes, Santiago, Chile
 1983 Chilean, Inside and Out, NGBK, Kunstamt Kreuzberg, West Berlin, Germany
 1983 Virginia Errázuriz and Francisco Brugnoli, Galería Sur, Santiago, Chile
 1984 The Art and the Survival of the Planet, National Museum of Natural History, Santiago, Chile
 1984 Caiman Gallery, New York, United States
 1985 Out of Serie, Galería Sur, Santiago, Chile
 1985 Bucci Gallery, Santiago, Chile
 1985 Época Gallery, Santiago Chile
 1985 Center for Art and Communication, Buenos Aires, Argentina
 1986 Women Recorders, Plastic Art Gallery 3, Santiago, Chile
 1986 Bucci Gallery, Santiago, Chile
 1987 Women in Focus, Vancouver, Canada
 1988 Alejandro Lipschutz Institute of Sciences, Santiago, Chile
 1988 Fragments of Contemporary Art, (100 works by Chilean artists), Palazzo Valentini, Rome, Italy
 1989 Posada del Corregidor Gallery, Santiago, Chile
 1989 Installation at Tresbolillo, Staatlichen Kunsthalle, Berlin
 1989 Plastic Surgery, Staatlichen Kunsthalle, Berlin, Germany
 1990 From Hope to Creation, National Museum of Fine Arts, Santiago, Chile
 1991 Self-portraits of Chilean Painters, New Plastic Gallery, Santiago, Chile
 1991 Contemporary Art from Chile, American Solciety, N.Y
 1991 Women in Art, National Museum of Fine Arts, Santiago, Chile.
 1992 IV Biennial of Art, Havana, Cuba
 1992 Chilean Shipping to the X Mostra da Gravura, Curitiba, Brazil
 1993 II INTEGRA Meeting, Painting with Children, National Museum of Fine Arts, Santiago. Chile
 1996 Installation for El Lugar Ideal project, Huérfanos street 1721, Santiago, Chile
2018 Radical Women: Latin American Art, 1960–1985, Pinacoteca de São Paulo

Selected works 
Errázuriz creates her artwork using materials that are either unwanted or found, which typically relate to the economy. Her collection was put away and unclassified for a long period. When her collection was eventually put out it gained recognition. Her artwork can be viewed in the Chilean National Collections, which is located in the Museo de Arte Contemporaneo and Museo de la Solidaridad Salvador Allende in Santiago.

Her art is meant to represent social and political issues in Chile. She creates puzzles that the audience must piece together via "knick-knacks, postcards, and other mundane objects, to which the spectator must ascribe meaning and use as a basis for interpretation."

I'll Be Right Back, 1965 
This piece was inspired by multiple found items near her, to help describe the daily life of an individual.

Tapestry (The Debutant), 1966  
This piece is an installation exhibited in the Space to Dream.

Diary of a Day, 1979  
This self-portrait was created using known objects that she used daily to create her art. She used a small spiral notebook to represent her diary that contains drawings and objects that help demonstrates her daily life.

Personal life 
She married Francisco Brugnoli.

References 

 
1941 births
Living people
Chilean women painters
20th-century Chilean painters
20th-century Chilean women artists
21st-century Chilean painters
21st-century Chilean women artists
Artists from Santiago
University of Chile alumni
York University alumni